Pararrhopalia is a genus of cavibelonian solenogasters, shell-less, worm-like, marine mollusks.

References

Cavibelonia